The current Indonesian Minister of State Owned Enterprises is Erick Thohir since 23 October 2019. The minister is supported by Deputy Minister of State Owned Enterprises which is Pahala Mansury and Kartika Wirjoatmodjo. The Minister administers the portfolio through the Ministry of State Owned Enterprises.

List of ministers
The following individuals have been appointed as Minister of State Owned Enterprises, or any of its precedent titles:

Political Party:

List of deputy ministers
On 19 October 2011, President Susilo Bambang Yudhoyono formed the Deputy Minister of State Owned Enterprises by appointing Mahmuddin Yasin as the first person to serve. He was appointed to make BUMN the driving force of the national economy. The following individuals have been appointed as Deputy Minister of State Owned Enterprises, or any of its precedent titles:

Political Party:

See also 
 Ministry of State Owned Enterprises

References

State